Intercaste marriage (ICM), also known as marrying out of caste, is a form of exogamous nuptial union that involve two individuals belonging to different castes. Intercaste marriages are particularly perceived as socially unacceptable and taboo in most parts of South Asia.

By region

India
5.8% of marriages in India are intercaste marriages.

Nepal 

Nepal has many castes and inter-caste marriage is generally considered taboo. However, this kind of marriage has been gradually gaining acceptance. In 1854, the Government of Nepal passed the "Muluki Ain" commissioned by Jung Bahadur Rana. This law outlawed marriage between people of a lower caste with those of a higher caste. In 1963, King Mahendra modified the law to abolish the "caste-based unequal citizenship". Since then, inter-caste marriage has been gradually gaining acceptance throughout Nepal.

In 2009, the Government of Nepal announced that it would give a sum of रू100,000 Nepalese rupees (roughly US$1,350) away to couples who have an inter-caste marriage. The recipients would have to claim the sum within 30 days of the marriage. Republica, however, has reported that there was no "government assistance for Dalit women" who were left jilted by their upper-caste husbands.

Pakistan 
Although “love marriages” not arranged by families may be allowed among the upper class Pakistanis, among other social classes intercaste marriages are socially not accepted. A 2011 study that examined Punjabi women reported that women in intercaste marriages are subjected to a greater risk of violence compared to other Pakistani women in general. Honor killings due to intercaste marriages have been extensively reported by Pakistani media agencies.

South Asian diaspora 
Intercaste marriages in diaspora communities of people of South Asian descent, such as those in United Kingdom, are reported to be not prevalent. In 2011 an intercaste couple from UK claimed that their bosses had discriminated against them because of their relationship.

Religious views

Islam 
Islam does not prevent marriages between individuals based on racial, ethnological, tribal or caste grounds, though every marriage still need to conform Islamic marital laws that prevents marriage of a muslim women to a non muslim men and a muslim men to polytheist women.

See also 

 Homogamy
 Hypergamy and hypogamy

References 

Morganatic marriage
Exogamy
Caste